(born September 13, 1947) is the owner and founder of Aeon Corporation, one of the "Big Four" eikaiwa (conversational English) schools in Japan.

Founding of Aeon 

In 1973, Aki and university classmate Tsuneo Kusunoki founded the company AMVIC. The name was an acronym of the phrase "for AMbition and VICtory." The company would focus on foreign language studies.

Later, AMVIC International was split into two divisions.

In 1989, AMVIC International split into two separate companies, as the former partners developed differing visions of the company's future. Aki's company became Aeon, focusing on language learning in Japan. He remains Aeon's chairman as of 2010. Kusunoki's company became GEOS, focusing on global language learning with focus on English language education. GEOS and Aeon remained competitors until April 2010 when GEOS filed for bankruptcy protection.

Personal life
Aki's wife is Italian-American, and his daughter is Angela Aki.

References

1947 births
Living people
English conversation schools in Japan
Japanese businesspeople